Sphaerolobium macranthum is a species of flowering plant in the family Fabaceae and is endemic to the south-west of Western Australia. It is an erect shrub with only a few scale-like leaves, and yellow or orange and red flowers.

Description
The leaves are reduced to a few small scales, sometimes in whorls around the stem. The standard petal is broad and longer than the other petals and the keel is broad, and rounded at the top. Flowering occurs in September and October and the fruit is a pod that is wider than long.

Taxonomy
Sphaerolobium macranthum was first formally described in 1848 by  Carl Meissner in Lehmann's Plantae Preissianae. The specific epithet (macranthum) means "large-flowered".

Distribution and habitat
Sphaerolobium macranthum grows in sandy soils in near-coastal areas of the Avon Wheatbelt, Esperance Plains, Geraldton Sandplains, Jarrah Forest, Swan Coastal Plain and Warren bioregions of south-western Western Australia and is listed as "not threatened" by the Government of Western Australia Department of Biodiversity, Conservation and Attractions.

References

macranthum
Eudicots of Western Australia
Plants described in 1848
Taxa named by Carl Meissner